Fritz Reiser (born 1875, date of death unknown) was a German long-distance runner. He competed in the men's marathon at the 1908 Summer Olympics.

References

1875 births
Year of death missing
Athletes (track and field) at the 1908 Summer Olympics
German male long-distance runners
German male marathon runners
Olympic athletes of Germany
Place of birth missing